Khaleh Saray, also rendered as Khalehsara, may refer to:
 Khaleh Saray-e Panjah va Haft
 Khaleh Saray-e Panjah va Noh